Return of the Mac is an American sitcom that was created by Joey McIntyre and Paul Greenberg. The series stars Joey McIntyre, Adam Ray, Jamie Denbo, Katie Wee, Punam Patel and Barrett McIntyre. The series premiered on Pop on April 12, 2017.

Cast 
Joey McIntyre as Joey McIntyre
Adam Ray as Alex 
Jamie Denbo as Sam Kandor 
Katie Wee as Paige Kwan 
Punam Patel as Soozie 
Barrett McIntyre as Barrett McIntyre
Donnie Wahlberg as Donnie Wahlberg
Jenny McCarthy as Jenny McCarthy
Griffin McIntyre as Griffin McIntyre
Rhys McIntyre as Rhys McIntyre
Kira McIntyre as Kira McIntyre
Anthony Gioe as Flan 
Jordan Black as Malcolm

Episodes

References

External links
 

2010s American sitcoms
2017 American television series debuts
2017 American television series endings
English-language television shows
Television series by CBS Studios
Pop (American TV channel) original programming